The 1916 Mercer Baptists football team was an American football team that represented Mercer University as a member of the Southern Intercollegiate Athletic Association (SIAA) during the 1916 college football season. In their second year under head coach Jake Zellars and first under David Peacock, the team compiled an 1–6 record, with a mark of 0–5 in the SIAA.

Schedule

References

Mercer
Mercer Bears football seasons
Mercer Baptists football